Airville is a rural locality in the Shire of Burdekin, Queensland, Australia.

Geography 
Airville is bounded on the south-east by the Burdekin River. It is flat low-lying land (about 10 metres above sea level) used predominantly for sugarcane plantations. There is a network of cane tramways to deliver the harvested sugar to the local sugar mills.

Maida Vale is a neighbourhood in the north-east of the locality.

Labatt Lagoon is a waterhole.

History 
Airdale Provisional School opened in the south-west of the locality on 2 September 1890, becoming Airdale State School on 1 January 1909. In 1926, it was renamed Airville State School.

Maidavale State School opened in the north-east of the locality on 27 April 1910.

Education 
Airville State School is a government primary (Prep-6) school for boys and girls at Old Clare Road. In 2016, the school had an enrolment of 23 students who come from the local rural community with 3 teachers (2 full-time equivalent) and 5 non-teaching staff (3 full-time equivalent). In 2018, the school had an enrolment of 9 students with 2 teachers (1 full-time equivalent) and 4 non-teaching staff (3 full-time equivalent).

Maidavale State School is a government primary (Prep-6) school for boys and girls at Maidavale Road. In 2016, the school had an enrolment of 10 students with 2 teachers (1 full-time equivalent) and 5 non-teaching staff (2 full-time equivalent). In 2018, the school had an enrolment of 6 students with 2 teachers (1 full-time equivalent) and 4 non-teaching staff (2 full-time equivalent).

There is no secondary school in Airville. The nearest secondary schools are Ayr State High School in Ayr to the north-east and Home Hill State High School in neighbouring Home Hill to the south-east.

References

External links 

Shire of Burdekin
Localities in Queensland